Kgalagadi, meaning "Land of the thirst", is a geographical area located in Southern Africa. It may also refer to:

 Kgalagadi District, Botswana
 Kgalagadi language 
 Kgalagadi Transfrontier Park

de:Kgalagadi District
es:Distrito de Kgalagadi
fr:District de Kgalagadi
it:Kgalagadi
no:Kgalagadi District
pt:Kgalagadi (distrito)